MKI may refer to:

Sukhoi Su-30MKI, Russian fighter aircraft
MKI (IT service company) (Mitsui Knowledge Industry), Japan